Romantic Punch is a rock band based in South Korea, which currently has four members. The band was formed in July 2003 as a Christian indie band "WA★DISH" (Wash the Dishes) and changed its name to "Romantic Punch" in May 2009. They originally had five members, but, Park Hana (the group's bassist), who was on pregnancy leave at the time, left the group on March 9, 2015. No specific reason or explanation was given for her departure.

Besides playing at various rock festivals, they perform their solo concert titled "Romantic Party" at regular intervals.  Their fan club is expanding continuously and currently has more than ten thousand members.

In 2014 they have staged more than 1000 street concerts in various locations and regions in Korea.

Their management agency is "Queen Entertainment" based in Seoul, Korea. In January 2013, they signed a contract with "Kiss Entertainment" as their management office in Japan,  but after 2013, the band have had no major activities in Japan.

Members 
 In-hyuk (Full Name： 배인혁, Birthday：June 9) - Vocal
 Konchi (Full Name: 강호윤, Birthday：November 30) - Guitar
 Lazy (Full Name：권영환, Birthday：August 10) - Guitar
 Tricky (Full Name：고용진, Birthday：March 11) - Drum (2009-)

Discography

Album 
 Midnight Cinderella (2010)
 Glam Slam (2013)
SOS(2020)

Mini-Album 
 Bright Sunlight Day（햇살 밝은 날） (2004) - released album from "WA★DISH" age
 Saturday Night (Feb. 28, 2006) - released album from "WA★DISH" age
 Romantic Punch (2009)
 It's Yummy (2011)
 Silent Night (2012)

Award 
 2003 - MBC "Korea Music Festival" Amateur Rock Concert - 1st place
 2011 - olle "Music Indie Award" Artist of the Month - Awarded
 2011 - KB Year-End National Rock Festival Contest - Grand Prize
 2012 - KBS2TV "Top Band Season 2" - 2nd Place

Live Performances 
2009 to Present - Romantic Punch solo concert "Romantic Party" (53rd Romantic Party in May 2014)
2009 to Present - Street performance over 1000 times
2009 - 2009 Pentaport Rock Festival
2010 - 2010 Jisan Valley Rock Festival
2012 - 2012 Pentaport Rock Festival
2012 - Super Sonic 2012
2013 - Green Plugged 2013, 2013 Pentaport Rock Festival
Also playing in various music events
In Japan, they had live performances in Okayama(2013) and Tokyo(2012、2013).

Major Tie-up 
2009年 - SBS "Green Saver" - theme song
2012年 - NARUTO SD - theme song（*In Korea only）
2012年 - Mabikino - OST
2012年 - tvn drama "My Cute Guys"  OST "Ready-Merry-Go!"

Appearances and Media 
2009 - EBS "Space Compathy"
2012 - KBS "Top Band Season 2"
2013 - KBS "7080 Concert", Mnet "MUST", etc.
2014 - MBC "SHOW CHAMPION"

References

External links 
 Facebook
 Official Twitter

2003 establishments in South Korea
Musical groups established in 2003
South Korean rock music groups